DirectLOGIC is a range of programmable logic controllers produced by Koyo.

They are programmed using DirectSOFT via:
 RS-232
 USB port with USB-to-Serial adapter
 10BASE-T or 10/100 Ethernet network card

Models
 DL05 Micro PLC
 DL06 Micro Modular PLC
 DL105 Fixed I/O (brick) PLC
 DL205 Modular PLC
 DL305 Legacy PLC, compatible with the General Electric Series One, the Texas Instruments Series 305, and the Siemens SIMATIC TI305.
 DL405 Specialty PLC

See also
 SCADA

External links
 Koyo PLCs

Industrial automation
Japanese brands